Clara Burel was the defending champion but chose to participate at the 2022 Karlsruhe Open instead.

Ylena In-Albon won the title, defeating Carolina Alves in the final, 4–6, 6–4, 6–3.

Seeds

Draw

Finals

Top half

Bottom half

References

Main Draw

Edge Open Saint-Gaudens Occitanie - Singles